The 2020 United States presidential election in South Carolina was held on Tuesday, November 3, 2020, as part of the 2020 United States presidential election in which all 50 states plus the District of Columbia participated. South Carolina voters chose electors to represent them in the Electoral College via a popular vote, pitting the Republican Party's nominee, incumbent President Donald Trump, and running mate Vice President Mike Pence against Democratic Party nominee, former Vice President Joe Biden, and his running mate California Senator Kamala Harris. South Carolina has nine electoral votes in the Electoral College.

Trump carried South Carolina by a margin of 11.68%, down from his 14.27% margin four years earlier. Prior to this election, all 12 news organizations considered this a state Trump would win, or a red state. Biden became the first Democrat to win the presidency without Chester and Dillon Counties since Harry Truman in 1948, when the state's governor, Strom Thurmond, carried all but two of the state's counties as the Dixiecrat nominee; as well as the first Democrat to win without  Clarendon County since 1964.

Primary elections

Canceled Republican primary

On September 7, 2019, the South Carolina Republican Party became one of several state GOP affiliates to cancel their respective primaries and caucuses officially. Donald Trump's re-election campaign and GOP officials have cited the fact that Republicans canceled several state primaries when George H. W. Bush and George W. Bush sought second terms in 1992 and 2004, respectively, and Democrats scrapped some of their primaries when Bill Clinton and Barack Obama were seeking re-election in 1996 and 2012, respectively.

In response to the cancellation, former U.S. Representative Bob Inglis and another South Carolina Republican voter filed a lawsuit against the South Carolina Republican Party on grounds that it denied their right to vote. On December 11, 2019, a state court judge dismissed the lawsuit, writing in his opinion that the law "does not give plaintiffs a legal right to presidential preference primary". Thus at the South Carolina State Republican Convention in May 2020, the state party formally bound all 50 of its national pledged delegates to Trump.

Democratic primary
The South Carolina Democratic primary was held on February 29, 2020.

General election

Predictions

Polling
Graphical summary

Aggregate polls

Polls

Donald Trump vs. Bernie Sanders

Donald Trump vs. Elizabeth Warren

Donald Trump vs. Michael Bloomberg

Donald Trump vs. Amy Klobuchar

Donald Trump vs. Pete Buttigieg

Donald Trump vs. Tom Steyer

Donald Trump vs. Andrew Yang

Donald Trump vs. Cory Booker

Donald Trump vs Kamala Harris

Donald Trump vs. Beto O'Rourke

with Donald Trump, Bernie Sanders, and Howard Schultz

with Donald Trump, Elizabeth Warren, and Howard Schultz

with Donald Trump, generic Democrat, and Howard Schultz

Results

Results by county

Counties that flipped from Democratic to Republican
Dillon (Largest city: Dillon)
Clarendon (Largest city: Manning)

Results by congressional district
Trump won 6 of the 7 congressional districts.

Analysis
South Carolina—a Deep Southern Bible Belt state that was once part of the Democratic Solid South—has had a Republican tendency since 1964. Since its narrow vote for Kennedy in 1960, it has voted Democratic only in 1976, for Jimmy Carter, the former governor of the neighboring state of Georgia. Accordingly, it has long been the most conservative state on the East Coast of the United States, although it has not been as conservative as its fellow Deep South states of Alabama, Mississippi, and Louisiana, largely due to populous and fast-growing Charleston and Richland Counties' trending more Democratic in the 21st century. As in the case of other Deep Southern states, South Carolina also has a large African-American population that helps keep the state somewhat more competitive than much of the Upper South. (The final state in the Deep South, Georgia, has become much more competitive than any of its fellow Deep South states in recent years due to the explosive growth of the Atlanta area.)

Trump performed somewhat better than polls anticipated, as aggregate polls averaged him only 7 points ahead of Biden. He flipped Clarendon County for the first time since 1972 and Dillon County for the first time since 1988. Biden became the first Democrat since Lyndon B. Johnson in 1964 to win the presidency without Clarendon County and the first Democrat since Harry S. Truman to win without Dillon County.

Per exit polls by the Associated Press, Trump's strength in the Palmetto State came from White, born-again/Evangelical Christians, who supported Trump by 87%–9%. South Carolina is entirely in the Bible Belt. As is the case in many Southern states, there was a stark racial divide in voting for this election: White South Carolinians supported Trump by 69%–29%, while Black South Carolinians supported Biden by 92%–7%.

In other elections, longtime Republican U.S. Senator Lindsey Graham won another term in the United States Senate by 10.27 percentage points over Democrat Jaime Harrison. While Harrison lost by a double-digit margin, he still slightly outperformed Biden.

This is the first time since 1992 that South Carolina and Georgia did not vote for the same presidential candidate—in 1992, Georgia voted for the victorious Democratic Party challenger, Bill Clinton, while South Carolina voted to re-elect the Republican president, George H. W. Bush. 

South Carolina was the only East Coast state in 2020 to vote Republican by a double-digit margin. This was the first time that both main party candidates won more than one million votes in a statewide election in South Carolina, alongside the concurrent Senate election.

See also
 United States presidential elections in South Carolina
 2020 South Carolina elections
 2020 United States presidential election
 2020 Democratic Party presidential primaries
 2020 Republican Party presidential primaries
 2020 United States elections

Notes
Partisan clients

Additional candidates

References

External links
 
 
  (State affiliate of the U.S. League of Women Voters)
 

South Carolina
2020
Presidential